US Post Office-Rossville Main, also known as Rossville Post Office, is a post office built in 1931 in Rossville, Georgia.  It is a brick, two-story building with Georgian Revival style, with a tetrastyle pedimented portico.  An eagle emblem is inset to the transom over the double front doors within the portico.  It has tall 12 over 12 windows and a tile, mansard roof interrupted by dormer windows.

The original post office in Rossville was in the John Ross House, preserved on the National Register and located just behind this post office.  John Ross was a leader of the Cherokee Indians.

References

External links

Post office buildings on the National Register of Historic Places in Georgia (U.S. state)
Colonial Revival architecture in Georgia (U.S. state)
Government buildings completed in 1931
National Register of Historic Places in Walker County, Georgia